Marcus Stephen Hahnemann (born June 15, 1972) is an American former professional soccer player who played as a goalkeeper.

Graduating out of Seattle Pacific University, he played for the Seattle Sounders between 1994 and 1996. Between 1997 and 1999 he turned out for the Colorado Rapids, signing with English club Fulham in 1999. Unable to become the first-choice goalkeeper at Fulham, he enjoyed loan spells with Rochdale and Reading, before signing permanently with Reading in 2002. In 2009, following 276 league appearances for the club, he transferred to Wolverhampton Wanderers.

He has won nine caps for the United States, featuring as back-up for Kasey Keller and Tim Howard in two World Cups. Following his debut for the States in 1994 he played two further games within the same month, however he had to wait almost nine years before his next international appearance, making him a player with one of the longest ever gaps between caps.

Early years
Hahnemann grew up in the Seattle area in Kent and attended Kentridge High School where he was named the team's MVP his junior season. He transferred to Newport High School in Bellevue, Washington for his senior season. That year, he kept eleven clean sheets en route to being named the All-King County goalkeeper.

He played college soccer for the Seattle Pacific University Falcons. A Division II powerhouse, Hahnemann led SPU to the NCAA Division II National Championship in 1993. Over his four seasons at SPU, Hahnemann had a 64–9–5 record as a starter, with forty-six career clean sheets.

Club career

Seattle Sounders
Hahnemann's professional career started when he signed with the Seattle Sounders of the A-League on May 1, 1994. In his first season with the Sounders, Hahnemann registered a .57 GAA in fourteen games to take the league's top goalkeeper honors.  In 1995, he played twenty-nine games as the Sounders won the league championship. In 1996, the Sounders repeated as champions while Hahnemann kept eleven clean sheets and made 119 saves.

Colorado Rapids
Hahnemann waited until 1997 to join Major League Soccer (MLS), signing with the Colorado Rapids. His first appearance was on April 20, 1997 coming on as a substitute for Paul Grafer; Hahneman then started the next 23 MLS league games that season, and he also appeared in the U.S. Open Cup. In his first season in MLS, the Rapids went all the way to the MLS Cup before losing 2–1 to D.C. United. 
During his second season in 1998, he set a club record for the most games and minutes played in a single season by a goalkeeper, playing 2,520 minutes in 28 games and compiling a 16–12 record, and was named their Defender of the Year.

Fulham
After two and a half seasons with the Colorado Rapids, he signed with English First Division club Fulham, for £80,000 in June 1999. He failed to displace Maik Taylor in goal though, and only made four appearances (two in the league) in total for the London club (all during their promotion season of 2000–01).

With Edwin van der Sar signed upon promotion by Fulham, Hahnemann slipped further down the pecking order and to gain playing time, he was loaned out to lower league sides Rochdale, and then, Reading during the 2001–02 campaign. He made six appearances for the latter as part of their promotion from the third tier. At the end of the 2001–02 season, Hahnemann was released by the club after spending three years. Hahnemann then signed a one-month contract extension after spending time with the club.

Reading
Hahnemann then joined Reading permanently in Summer 2002 on a free transfer, becoming their first choice 'keeper. His first full season with the Royals saw them miss out on promotion to the Premier League in the play-offs, before two successive seasons saw them narrowly fall short of further play-off finishes.

He missed just one game of the 2005–06 season that saw Reading win promotion to the top flight of English soccer for the first time in their history, as they topped the Championship with a record 106 points. He was named in that season's Championship Team of the Year by the Professional Footballers' Association.

His first season in the Premier League saw him keep thirteen clean sheets as the club finished eighth, only one place short of European qualification. He made the most saves (139) in the Premier League during 2007, but could not halt relegation in their second Premier League campaign.

He remained with the club for one further season as they attempted an immediate return to the top level, but Reading ultimately lost out to Burnley in the play-off semi finals. Subsequently, Reading announced that they would not renew Hahnemann's contract making him a free agent.

Wolves
On June 17, 2009, Hahnemann signed a one-year contract with newly promoted Premier League side Wolverhampton Wanderers. He was back-up to first-choice Wayne Hennessey for the opening four months, until Hennessey conceded four goals in two successive games and lost his place to Hahnemann. Hahnemann remained first choice keeper for the remainder of the season, helping the club attain survival. His form ranked him as "the Best Goalkeeper in the World" using the Castrol Performance Index system, helping earn him a one-year contract extension.

However, the 2010–11 season saw the team enter a dismal run of form that left them bottom of the league and in danger of relegation. Hahnemann was dropped after a defeat to relegation rivals Blackpool in late November and did not feature again. He was released at the end of the campaign, after the expiry of his contract.

Everton
On September 23, 2011, Hahnemann signed for Everton on a short-term deal. He was released from the club on May 18, 2012 without making a first team appearance, along with Scottish international James McFadden and four others who also did not feature in the first team.

Seattle Sounders FC
On September 14, 2012, Hahnemann made his long anticipated return to the Sounders. Seattle traded a conditional draft pick to Toronto FC for the number one allocation slot, so they would be able to sign Hahnemann.
He made his debut on October 24, 2012 against Marathón in a CONCACAF Champions League group stage match. At Seattle, Hahnemann was a backup behind Michael Gspurning. Hahnemann made his first MLS appearance for Seattle on August 3, 2013, keeping a clean sheet in a 3–0 win against FC Dallas.

On December 8, 2014, he announced his retirement from professional soccer.

International career

Hahnemann made his international debut for the United States national team on November 19, 1994, in a 0–1 friendly defeat to Trinidad and Tobago. He played two more games in the rest of the year.

Hahnemann did not play for the US again until June 8, 2003 when he played the first half of a 2–1 friendly win over New Zealand in Richmond, Virginia. The game was a warm-up for the Confederations Cup, for which he was selected.

He won two further caps during 2005 and was then picked for the 2006 World Cup in Germany, and allocated shirt number 19, but was an unused substitute in all of the United States' matches behind Kasey Keller and Tim Howard as they exited at the group stage. During the group stage, he and teammate Bobby Convey became the first Reading players to be named to a World Cup roster.

Nearing the age of 38, Hahnemann was named by coach Bob Bradley to the United States' 2010 World Cup squad, as third choice behind Howard and Brad Guzan. Hahnemann made his ninth and final appearance for the U.S. in 2011.

Personal life

Marcus Hahnemann is a Republican; his wife Amanda is a Democrat. He keeps hens, and also enjoys mountain biking and hunting. Before matches he listens to heavy metal to psych himself up, and presented Five Finger Death Punch with a Wolves shirt emblazoned with a Remembrance Day poppy. He collaborated with the Reading-based band Malefice in early 2012 to release a song which will debut on Jägermeister UK's Facebook page in February 2012. Hahnemann is of German descent, his parents come from Wentorf bei Hamburg.

Although he did not have defective vision, Hahnemann wore special contact lenses to reduce the glare of the sun when he played. At Reading, he gifted every match jersey to fans after games; he also cut his sleeves due to personal preference when the manufacturers no longer provided short sleeves.

In April 2016, Hahnemann and his former USMNT goalkeeper teammate Kasey Keller became coaches of the boys' soccer team at Newport High School, his former school in Bellevue, Washington.

Career statistics

Bibliography
Marcus Hahnemann's Premiership Diary (2007), Know the Score Books

Honors
Seattle Sounders
League Championship: 1995, 1996

Reading
Football League Championship: 2005–06

United States
CONCACAF Gold Cup: 2005

Individual
PFA Team of the Year: 2005–06 Football League Championship

References

External links

Official club profile

Marcus Hahnemann profile and career stats at footballdatabase.com
Marcus Hahnemann profile at ussoccer.com
Premier League profile 

1972 births
Living people
American soccer players
Expatriate footballers in England
American expatriate sportspeople in England
Seattle Pacific Falcons men's soccer players
Seattle Sounders (1994–2008) players
Colorado Rapids players
Fulham F.C. players
Rochdale A.F.C. players
Reading F.C. players
Wolverhampton Wanderers F.C. players
Everton F.C. players
Seattle Sounders FC players
Association football goalkeepers
CONCACAF Gold Cup-winning players
2003 FIFA Confederations Cup players
2005 CONCACAF Gold Cup players
2006 FIFA World Cup players
2010 FIFA World Cup players
2011 CONCACAF Gold Cup players
United States men's international soccer players
Major League Soccer players
Premier League players
English Football League players
A-League (1995–2004) players
Soccer players from Seattle
American people of German descent
Major League Soccer broadcasters
Association football coaches